Cyananthus microphyllus, called the small-leaved bluebell-flower, is a species of flowering plant in the genus Cyananthus, native to the western Himalayas, Nepal, and Tibet. It has gained the Royal Horticultural Society's Award of Garden Merit.

Subtaxa
The following subspecies are currently accepted:
Cyananthus microphyllus subsp. microphyllus
Cyananthus microphyllus subsp. williamsonii K.K.Shrestha

References

Campanuloideae
Plants described in 1846
Flora of West Himalaya
Flora of Nepal
Flora of Tibet